Arley Méndez Perez (born 31 December 1993) is a Chilean weightlifter, World Champion and two time Pan American Champion competing in the 85 kg category until 2018 and 89 kg starting in 2018 after the International Weightlifting Federation reorganized the categories.

Career
He competed for Chile at the 2017 World Weightlifting Championships winning the gold medal in all three categories in the –85 kg division, ahead of the Olympic champion and heavy favorite Kianoush Rostami.

In 2018 he competed in the newly created 89 kg category at the 2018 World Weightlifting Championships in Ashgabat winning a gold medal in the Snatch portion of the competition.

He represented Chile at the 2020 Summer Olympics.

Major results

References

External links 
 

Living people
1993 births
Chilean male weightlifters
World Weightlifting Championships medalists
Naturalized citizens of Chile
Weightlifters at the 2020 Summer Olympics
Olympic weightlifters of Chile
20th-century Chilean people
21st-century Chilean people